Dileepbhai Sanghani (born 12 May 1954) is an Indian politician and former Cabinet Minister in the Bharatiya Janata Party ministry of Gujarat state of India.

He was 
a minister of Agriculture, Co-operation Animal Husbandry, Fisheries, Cow-Breeding, Prison, Excise Law & Justice, Legislative & Parliamentary Affairs. He was a member of the Gujarat Legislative Assembly. He was earlier member of the Lok Sabha representing Amreli for four terms.

References
Gujarat government
Biodata in the Lok Sabha website
History Of Sanghani

Bharatiya Janata Party politicians from Gujarat
Living people
India MPs 1991–1996
1954 births
State cabinet ministers of Gujarat
India MPs 1996–1997
India MPs 1998–1999
India MPs 1999–2004
Lok Sabha members from Gujarat
People from Amreli district
Indian National Congress politicians
Gujarat MLAs 1980–1985
Gujarat MLAs 1985–1990
Gujarat MLAs 2007–2012